50,000 Fall Fans Can't Be Wrong (subtitled 39 Golden Greats) is a greatest hits album by English post-punk band the Fall, released in 2004 by record label Sanctuary.

Content 

50,000 is the group's first career-spanning compilation album, with a selection of songs from the 1978 EP Bingo-Master's Break-Out! up to the 2003 album The Real New Fall LP (Formerly Country on the Click). The selection of songs includes both singles and album highlights. Journalist and author, Daryl Easlea compiled the album and wrote the sleevenotes.

The cover and title of the album is a parody of Elvis Presley's 50,000,000 Elvis Fans Can't Be Wrong (1959).

In November 2018, the album was repackaged and expanded as 58 Golden Greats on Cherry Red Records. The new cover also referenced an Elvis Presley album, this time the UK edition of Elvis' 40 Greatest.

Reception 

Critic Phil Freeman included the compilation on a list of records attempting to define "the state of music since 1979" in the 2007 book Marooned: The Next Generation of Desert Island Discs. Noting the Fall as "one of the most polarizing bands on the planet", Freeman wrote that the album "will either begin a lifelong obsession, or you'll never make it to track two." Comedian Frank Skinner became a Fall fan, "with all the zeal of a convert", after listening to the compilation in 2005, calling it "the music I've been searching for my whole life."

Track listing

58 Golden Greats track listing

The expanded and repackaged version, released in 2018, omitted two tracks from 50,000 Fall Fans Can't Be Wrong ("Crop-Dust" and "Green Eyed Loco-Man") but added 21 tracks, mostly from the period after the release of the earlier edition.

See also 
 List of compilation albums by The Fall

References

Sources

External links 
 

The Fall (band) compilation albums
2004 greatest hits albums
Sanctuary Records compilation albums